Laub may refer to:

People 
 Bill Laub (1878–1963), Mayor and American football player-coach
 Daryl Laub (born 1925), television and radio personality
 Donald Laub (born 1935), American plastic surgeon
 Dori Laub (1937–2018), Israeli-American psychiatrist and psychoanalyst
 Ferdinand Laub (1832–1875), Czech violinist
 Gabriel Laub (1928–1998), journalist, satirist and writer
 Gillian Laub (born 1975), American photographer and film maker
 Henry Laub (1792–1813), officer in the United States Navy
 Jack Laub (born 1926), American basketball player and pharmaceutical executive
 Jakob Laub (1884–1962), Austria-Hungarian physicist
 John Laub (born 1953), American criminologist
 Martin Laub (born 1944), American politician
 Michael Laub (born 1953), stage director and dance choreographer
 Michel Laub (born 1973), Brazilian writer and journalist
 Ole Henrik Laub (1937–2019), Danish novelist
 Phoebe Laub (born 1952), American singer, songwriter, and guitarist
 Richard Laub, American scientist
 Stephen Laub (born 1945), American artist
 Thomas Laub (1852–1927), Danish organist and composer

Other uses 
 Laub (card suit), a suit used on German playing cards
 USS Laub, several ships

See also 
 Laube, a surname
 Lob (disambiguation)

German toponymic surnames